Andy Allo  is a Cameroonian-American singer-songwriter, guitarist and actress. She released her first of three albums in 2009, and joined Prince's band, The New Power Generation, in 2011. She had a recurring role in three episodes of the comedy-drama series The Game in 2011, followed by a number of other roles, including a supporting role in the 2017 film Pitch Perfect 3 and the lead role of Nora in Amazon Prime's series Upload (2020).

Early life and education
Born in Bamenda, Northwest Region, Cameroon, Allo developed an interest in music at an early age; her mother taught her to play the piano at age seven. She also went to PNEU school Bamenda, Cameroon. She is the youngest of five siblings. Allo holds dual citizenship in the United States and Cameroon and moved with her sister Suzanne to Sacramento in 2000 at the age of eleven, joining three other siblings. Her Californian-born mother Sue, was forced to move back after suffering chronic fatigue syndrome. Her father Andrew Allo is an ecologist.

Allo's US education began in seventh grade at Arden Middle School in Sacramento, and she graduated in 2006 from El Camino Fundamental High School in Sacramento. Following high school, Allo attended American River College in Sacramento. At that time, Allo formed her own band, Allo and the Traffic Jam, which occasionally performed for tips on the corner of 22nd and J streets in Sacramento.

Career
Allo's first solo gig was an open mic night in 2008 at the Fox & Goose Public House in downtown Sacramento. In 2009, she released her first independent album, UnFresh, a collection of 12 original songs. The album's first single, "Dreamland", features the rapper Blu.

Allo's reputation as a musician led her to a role as a singer and guitarist in American musician Prince's band, the New Power Generation, in 2011. She began writing with Prince while on tour, collaborating on three songs, "Superconductor", "The Calm" and "Long Gone", which appear on Allo's album, Superconductor.

Superconductor was released on 20 November 2012, and the album debuted at number one on Amazon.com's Soul and R&B charts in France, the United Kingdom and the US The album also features musicians Maceo Parker and Trombone Shorty.. She also appeared in three songs on Prince's 2014 album Art Official Age, in "Breakdown", she sings background vocals, and in both "What It Feels Like" and "Time", she sings co-lead vocals. She would appear again in a Prince album in 2015, when he included "Rocknroll Loveaffair" in Hit n Run Phase Two, and it also includes "Xtralovable", which was originally released in 2011 and included a rap verse by Allo, but it was replaced by a horn section in this version.

In October 2014, she released her single "Tongue Tied". Hello was released in April 2015 and was funded through PledgeMusic. In the same year she collaborated with Prince on a covers project titled Oui Can Luv.

Allo first appeared on screen in 2011, in three episodes of the comedy-drama series The Game. She has been interviewed on the talk show Attack of the Show!, and performed her music on the talk show Jimmy Kimmel Live!.

In 2017, she appeared in the film Pitch Perfect 3 as Serenity, a member of the band called Evermoist, alongside Ruby Rose. Since 2020, she's played the female lead role of Nora in the Amazon Prime TV series Upload.

In March 2023, Allo guest voiced Lyanna Hazard, daughter of Shep Hazard and niece of Phee Genoa, in Star Wars: The Bad Batch.

Discography

Albums 
 UnFresh (2009)
 Superconductor (2012)
 Hello (2015)
 Oui Can Luv (2015)
 One Step Closer (2017)

Filmography

See also

 List of singer-songwriters
 List of Cameroonians
 List of funk musicians
 List of soul musicians
 List of rhythm guitarists
 List of pop and rock pianists
 Music of Cameroon

References

External links

 Andy Allo instagram
 
 

21st-century American actresses
21st-century American pianists
Cameroonian emigrants to the United States
21st-century Cameroonian women singers
Cameroonian female models
American funk guitarists
American funk keyboardists
American funk singers
Living people
American neo soul singers
People from Bamenda
American pop guitarists
American pop pianists
American rhythm and blues guitarists
Rhythm and blues pianists
American soul guitarists
American soul keyboardists
American television actresses
21st-century American women singers
21st-century American singers
21st-century American women guitarists
21st-century American guitarists
21st-century women pianists
Year of birth missing (living people)